Events in the year 1969 in Japan.

Incumbents
Emperor: Hirohito
Prime Minister: Eisaku Satō (Liberal Democratic)
Chief Cabinet Secretary: Shigeru Hori
Chief Justice of the Supreme Court: Masatoshi Yokota until January 10, Kazuto Ishida from January 11
President of the House of Representatives: Mitsujirō Ishii until July 16, Takechiyo Matsuda from December 3 to December 27
President of the House of Councillors: Yūzō Shigemune

Governors
Aichi Prefecture: Mikine Kuwahara 
Akita Prefecture: Yūjirō Obata 
Aomori Prefecture: Shunkichi Takeuchi 
Chiba Prefecture: Taketo Tomonō 
Ehime Prefecture: Sadatake Hisamatsu 
Fukui Prefecture: Heidayū Nakagawa 
Fukuoka Prefecture: Hikaru Kamei 
Fukushima Prefecture: Morie Kimura
Gifu Prefecture: Saburō Hirano 
Gunma Prefecture: Konroku Kanda 
Hiroshima Prefecture: Iduo Nagano 
Hokkaido: Kingo Machimura 
Hyogo Prefecture: Motohiko Kanai 
Ibaraki Prefecture: Nirō Iwakami 
Ishikawa Prefecture: Yōichi Nakanishi 
Iwate Prefecture: Tadashi Chida 
Kagawa Prefecture: Masanori Kaneko 
Kagoshima Prefecture: Saburō Kanemaru 
Kanagawa Prefecture: Bunwa Tsuda 
Kochi Prefecture: Masumi Mizobuchi 
Kumamoto Prefecture: Kōsaku Teramoto 
Kyoto Prefecture: Torazō Ninagawa 
Mie Prefecture: Satoru Tanaka 
Miyagi Prefecture: Shintaro Takahashi (until 27 March); Sōichirō Yamamoto (starting 28 March)
Miyazaki Prefecture: Hiroshi Kuroki 
Nagano Prefecture: Gon'ichirō Nishizawa 
Nagasaki Prefecture: Katsuya Sato 
Nara Prefecture: Ryozo Okuda 
Niigata Prefecture: Shiro Watari
Oita Prefecture: Kaoru Kinoshita 
Okayama Prefecture: Takenori Kato 
Osaka Prefecture: Gisen Satō 
Saga Prefecture: Sunao Ikeda 
Saitama Prefecture: Hiroshi Kurihara 
Shiga Prefecture: Kinichiro Nozaki 
Shiname Prefecture: Choemon Tanabe 
Shizuoka Prefecture: Yūtarō Takeyama 
Tochigi Prefecture: Nobuo Yokokawa 
Tokushima Prefecture: Yasunobu Takeichi 
Tokyo: Ryōkichi Minobe 
Tottori Prefecture: Jirō Ishiba 
Toyama Prefecture: Minoru Yoshida (until 1 December); Kokichi Nakada (starting 30 December)
Wakayama Prefecture: Masao Ohashi 
Yamagata Prefecture: Tōkichi Abiko 
Yamaguchi Prefecture: Masayuki Hashimoto 
Yamanashi Prefecture: Kunio Tanabe

Events
 January 5 - According to Japan Coast Guard official confirmed repopt, a bulk carrier Boriba Maru capsized off Nojimazaki Lighthouse, Chiba Prefecture, 31 crew were fatalities.
 January 18 to 19 - According to Japan National Police Agency official confirmed report, a fierce battle between riot police unit and extreme and core university students in Yasuda Auditorium, Tokyo University, during the 1968–69 Japanese university protests. A total of 457 students were arrested and 757 injured.
 February 5 - A resort hotel fire in Bandai-Atami Spa, Koriyama, Fukushima Prefecture, according to Fire and Disaster Management Agency, official confirmed report, 30 persons lost their lives, with 35 persons injured.
April 3- According to JFDMA official confirmed report, a gas explosion hit Moshiri coal mine in Akabira, Hokkaido, official resulting death toll is 19 persons, with 24 persons hurt. This mine officially shut down on April 30. 
 May 16 – Senon Security Service was founded, as predecessor name of FarEastern Security Service. 
 June 24 to July 11 - According to Japan Fire and Disaster Management Agency official confirmed report, a torrential rain, following landslide hit in Kagoshima Prefecture and Miyazaki Prefecture, this natural disaster total death number of 89 person.
 October 1 - The National Space Development Agency of Japan is established.
 December 1 - Sumitomo Bank introduces Japan's first ATM.
 December 27 - 1969 Japanese general election - Liberal Democratic Party win 47.6% of popular vote, Yoshirō Mori, Tsutomu Hata and Ichirō Ozawa all elected for first time

Births
 January 27 - Cornelius, rock musician, singer and producer (Flipper's Guitar)
 January 29 - Hyde, rock musician, singer and guitarist
 February 6 – Masaharu Fukuyama, singer-songwriter and actor
 February 20 - Keiji Takayama, professional wrestler
 March 12 - Akemi Okamura, voice actress
 March 15 - Yutaka Take, jockey
 March 29 - Chiaki Ishikawa, singer See-Saw
 April 11 - Chisato Moritaka, singer
 April 18 - Sayako Kuroda, formerly Sayako, Princess Nori, daughter of Emperor Akihito 
 May 15 - Hideki Irabu, baseball player
 May 18 – Noriyuki Makihara, singer-songwriter 
 June 4 - Takako Minekawa, musician, composer and writer
 June 29 - Tōru Hashimoto, politician, lawyer, mayor of Osaka city and former leader of the Japan Innovation Party
 July 8 - Sugizo, guitarist and singer
 July 18 - Masanori Murakawa, professional wrestler
 August 8 - Dick Togo, professional wrestler
 August 13 - Midori Ito, figure skater
 September 12 - Shigeki Maruyama, golfer
 October 2 - Jun Akiyama, professional wrestler
 October 3
Yuriko Ishida, actress and essayist 
Tetsuya, musician
 October 14 - Kōsuke Okano, voice actor
 November 17 - Ryōtarō Okiayu, voice actor
 November 20 - Sakura, musician
 December 13 - Hideo Ishikawa, voice actor
 December 20
Chisa Yokoyama, voice actress
Kenji Ogiwara, former nordic combined skier  
Tsugiharu Ogiwara, former nordic combined skier
 December 24
 Taro Goto, footballer
 Ryuji Kato, footballer
 Miyuki Matsushita, voice actress
 Mariko Shiga,  voice actress (d. 1989)

Deaths
 April 26 - Morihei Ueshiba, martial artist and founder of Aikido (b. 1883)
 June 1 - Michiyo Tsujimura, agricultural scientist (b. 1888)
 July 9 - Raizō Tanaka, admiral (b. 1892)
 July 17 - Ichikawa Raizō VIII, actor (b. 1931)

See also
 1969 in Japanese television
 List of Japanese films of 1969

References

 
1960s in Japan
Japan
Years of the 20th century in Japan